Frostius pernambucensis, or the Frost's toad, is a species of toad in the family Bufonidae. It is endemic to the eastern Brazil where it is known from the Paraíba, Pernambuco, Alagoas, and eastern Bahia states.

Description
The tympanum is small and vertically elliptical. The digits are long, laterally expanded, and have developed discs. Coloration of both dorsal and ventral surfaces is brown to light brown. The iris is yellow.

The male advertisement call is a long, pulsed call, lasting about eight seconds and having pulse rate of seven per second. The call is repeated about twice every minute.

Habitat and conservation
It lives in terrestrial and arboreal bromeliads and in leaf-litter of the forest-floor. Reproduction requires bromeliads where the eggs are laid. Males may also engage in visual displays and male-male contests.

The species is threatened by habitat loss caused by agricultural expansion, livestock grazing, clear-cutting, wood plantations and human settlement, and by collection of bromeliads. It can be found in several protected areas.

References

pernambucensis
Endemic fauna of Brazil
Amphibians of Brazil
Amphibians described in 1962
Taxonomy articles created by Polbot